Mount Versteeg is a  mountain summit located on the crest of the Sierra Nevada mountain range in California. It is situated on the common border of Tulare County with Inyo County, as well as the shared boundary of Sequoia National Park and John Muir Wilderness. Mt. Versteeg ranks as the 66th highest peak in California.

Etymology

The peak's name was officially adopted by the United States Board on Geographic Names in 1964 in memory of Chester Versteeg (1887–1963), lawyer, author, and prominent Sierra Club member who devoted much of his life to furthering interest in the Sierra Nevada. He is credited with 40 first ascents in the Sierra Nevada, such as Mount Tinemaha, Mount Goode, and Colosseum Mountain. As the first chairman the Sierra Club's Committee on Geographic Names, he was responsible for the naming of 250 geographical features in the Sierra Nevada, including Trojan Peak and Lake Helen of Troy, which he named for his alma mater, University of Southern California. The club's Angeles Chapter annually presents a Chester Versteeg Outings Award which is "for long-term and outstanding leadership in furthering the enjoyment and safety of the outings program."

Climate
According to the Köppen climate classification system, Mount Versteeg has an alpine climate. Most weather fronts originate in the Pacific Ocean, and travel east toward the Sierra Nevada mountains. As fronts approach, they are forced upward by the peaks, causing them to drop their moisture in the form of rain or snowfall onto the range (orographic lift). Precipitation runoff from this mountain drains west to the Kern River, and east to Owens Valley.

See also

 List of mountain peaks of California

References

External links
 Weather forecast: Mount Versteeg
 Chester Versteeg photo: Flickr

Mountains of Tulare County, California
Mountains of Sequoia National Park
Inyo National Forest
Mountains of Inyo County, California
Mountains of the John Muir Wilderness
North American 4000 m summits
Mountains of Northern California
Sierra Nevada (United States)